is a 2009 Japanese tokusatsu film that serves as a prequel and a sequel to the 2007 television series Jikuu Keisatsu Wecker Signa. It was released in theaters on July 25, 2009, for a limited release, and then released on two DVDs on July 31, 2009. The DVD releases divide the story of the film into the 1989 storyline starring and the 2009 storyline. Sanshiro Wada, Showtaro Morikubo, Ryo Shihono, Ai Hazuki, and Takaou Ayatsuki return from Wecker Signa, and are joined by newcomers Takuma Terashima, Miyu Irino, Ayumi Murata, Ayano Niina, and Hikari Yamaguchi, and veteran actor Susumu Kurobe, known for his portrayal of the original Ultraman Shin Hayata. The film's soundtrack is performed by electronica group Fantastic Explosion. This film is followed by Jikuu Keisatsu Wecker SIGHT in 2011.

Theme songs
Theme song
"Parallel World" by Showtaro Morikubo
Film opening theme
"Never Surrender" by Showtaro Morikubo
Film ending theme
 by Aki Misato

External links
Official website 

2009 films
Tokusatsu
Tokusatsu films
2000s Japanese films